Enigmatochromis lucanusi is a species of cichlid known only from the Foto River near Fria, Guinea.

This species grows to a length of  SL.  This species is the only known member of its genus. The specific name honours the friend of the author, Oliver Lucanus, a collector and aquarist who supplied Lamboj with information on where to look for this species.

References

Cichlid fish of Africa
Freshwater fish of West Africa
Fish described in 2009
Chromidotilapiini